Snow Lake is a lake in Lewis County, Washington. It is within Mount Rainier National Park. It is in a glacial cirque below Unicorn Peak, in the Tatoosh Range.
It also has a hiking trail, spanning about seven miles.

External links

Lakes of Washington (state)
Lakes of Lewis County, Washington
Mount Rainier National Park
Mount Rainier